Stephen Ross may refer to:

 Stephen Ross, Baron Ross of Newport (1926–1993), British politician; former Liberal Member of Parliament
 Stephen Ross (economist) (1944–2017), American economist and author
 Stephen David Ross (born 1935), American philosopher
 Stephen L. Ross (c. 1815–1891), American farmer and legislator
 Stephen M. Ross (born 1940), American real estate developer and owner of the Miami Dolphins
 Stephen M. Ross (politician) (born 1951), American politician in North Carolina

See also
Steve Ross (disambiguation)
Stephan Ross (1931-2020), Polish-American holocaust survivor